Château de Frœschwiller is a château in the commune of Frœschwiller, in the department of Bas-Rhin, Alsace, France. Built in 1890, it became a Monument historique in 2009.

References

Châteaux in Bas-Rhin
Monuments historiques of Bas-Rhin
Houses completed in 1890
1890 establishments in France